Lindsay Michael Tait (born 8 January 1982) is a New Zealand former professional basketball player.

Early life
Born in Sydney, New South Wales, Tait moved to Auckland as a four-year-old and later attended Avondale College where he was a member of the first Avondale team ever to win a New Zealand Secondary Schools Championship in 1999. Tait was awarded the Most Valuable Player award for the tournament.

Professional career
In 2000, Tait joined the Auckland Rebels of the New Zealand National Basketball League where he went on to play eight seasons for the club, winning three championships (2000, 2004 and 2005) and earned league MVP in 2005. During this time, he also played in the Australian National Basketball League for the Victoria Giants in 2002–03 as a development player, and the New Zealand Breakers from 2003 to 2006. He also played in Switzerland for BC Boncourt in 2006–07.

After an injury-riddled season for the Wollongong Hawks in 2007–08, Tait returned to New Zealand where he played for the Wellington Saints during the 2008 New Zealand NBL season before re-joining Wollongong for the 2008–09 NBL season. He went on to play a further three seasons for Wellington and won back-to-back championships (2010 and 2011) for the second time in his career. He also earned back-to-back Finals MVP honours in 2010 and 2011.

In December 2010, Tait signed with the Cairns Taipans for the rest of the 2010–11 NBL season.

In November 2011, Tait signed with the Auckland Pirates for the 2012 New Zealand NBL season, going on to captain the team to the 2012 NBL championship, as he captured his own personal championship three-peat in the process.

In December 2012, following the Pirates pulling out of the league, Tait signed a three-year deal with the Wellington Saints, returning to the club for a second stint. He went on to win the 2013 Most Valuable Player award, his third time doing so. In 2014, Tait led the Saints to an eighth NBL championship as he recorded his seventh title and was named the Final Four MVP.

On 9 April 2015, Tait was named Round 1 Player of the Week after he opened the 2015 season with a double-double of 22 points and 10 assists in a road win over the Taranaki Mountainairs on 2 April, then backed it up four days later with 22 points in a home win over the Canterbury Rams. He went on to lead the Saints back to the grand final, where they were defeated by the Southland Sharks.

On 5 November 2015, Tait signed a three-year deal with the Super City Rangers. On 26 March 2016, he recorded 19 points and 15 assists against the Canterbury Rams, setting a Rangers franchise record for assists in a game.

On 11 May 2018, Tait announced that the 2018 season would be his last in the NBL. The following day, he recorded a triple-double with 20 points, 10 rebounds and 14 assists in a 124–121 loss to the Manawatu Jets. On 7 June 2018, Tait became just the ninth player to reach 300 NBL games.

National team career
Tait made his international debut in 2003 for the New Zealand Tall Blacks and was a member of the 2006 Commonwealth Games side that won the silver medal in Melbourne. In 2009, Tait was the starting point guard for the New Zealand team that defeated the Australian Boomers on their way to winning the FIBA Oceania Championship. Tait participated in the 2010 FIBA World Championship in Turkey and was a member of the first ever New Zealand side to win the Stanković Cup in 2011 in China. He went on to play for New Zealand at the 2014 FIBA Basketball World Cup and 2015 FIBA Oceania Championship.

In May 2016, Tait retired from international basketball after a career spanning 12 years (2003–2015).

Coaching career
In June 2020, Tait was named an assistant coach for the Auckland Huskies.

Personal life
Tatit holds an English passport.

References

External links
2014 World Cup profile
2008 Olympic profile
Summer Slam coaching profile
ANBL stats
NZNBL stats
Basketball New Zealand profile
Original Breaker: Lindsay Tait

1982 births
Living people
Auckland Pirates players
Auckland Stars players
Basketball players at the 2006 Commonwealth Games
Basketball players from Sydney
Cairns Taipans players
Commonwealth Games silver medallists for New Zealand
Commonwealth Games medallists in basketball
New Zealand men's basketball players
People educated at Avondale College
Point guards
Shooting guards
Super City Rangers players
Victoria Giants players
Wellington Saints players
Wollongong Hawks players
2014 FIBA Basketball World Cup players
2010 FIBA World Championship players
Medallists at the 2006 Commonwealth Games